Mitra C. Emad is an American anthropologist and Distinguished University Teaching Professor at the University of Minnesota Duluth. She is known for her works on cultural constructions of the human body. Emad is a recipient of the Horace T. Morse-University of Minnesota Alumni Association Award.
She is also an established somatic and yoga educator.

Career
Emad received her BA from DePaul University in 1987 and her MA from the University of Chicago in 1989. She wrote her doctoral dissertation on acupuncture among Americans under the supervision of Eugenia Georges at Rice University in 1998. During her career at the University of Minnesota Duluth, she developed a Participatory Media Lab with David Syring (Professor of Anthropology at UMD).

References 

American women anthropologists
Living people
American yoga teachers
University of Minnesota Duluth faculty
DePaul University alumni
University of Chicago alumni
Rice University alumni
Cultural anthropologists
Year of birth missing (living people)